Catajapyx is a genus of diplurans in the family Japygidae.

Species
 Catajapyx aquilonaris (Silvestri, 1931)
 Catajapyx confusus (Silvestri, 1929)
 Catajapyx ewingi Fox, 1941
 Catajapyx jeanneli Silvestri, 1934
 Catajapyx propinquus Silvestri, 1948
 Catajapyx singularis Pagés, 1983

References

Diplura